WJEE is a Christian radio station licensed to Bolivar, Ohio, broadcasting on 90.1 MHz FM. WJEE serves the Canton, Ohio radio market.

History
The station was originally owned by Denny and Marge Hazen Ministries, Inc., and was branded "Faith Ministry Radio". Co-owner Denny Hazen died in 2015. The station was originally part of a simulcast with 90.9 FM WJDD in Carrollton, Ohio. In 2020, WJDD was sold to Educational Media Foundation for $100,000, which surrendered the license. Effective March 5, 2021, WJEE was sold to Soaring Eagle Promotions, Inc. dba Shine FM, for $50,000.

On December 17, 2021, the station was rebranded as "Rise FM".

References

External links
Rise FM Ohio's website

JEE
Radio stations established in 2011
2011 establishments in Ohio